The 2004–05 Los Angeles Kings season would have been the King's 38th season in the National Hockey League (NHL). However, the 2004–05 NHL lockout cancelled all of the scheduled games for the season.

Schedule
The Kings regular season schedules was announced on July 14, 2004.

|-
| 1 || September 23 || Phoenix Coyotes
|-
| 2 || September 25 || Anaheim Mighty Ducks
|-
| 3 || October 1 || @ Phoenix Coyotes
|-
| 4 || October 2 || @ Colorado Avalanche
|-
| 5 || October 6 || San Jose Sharks
|-
| 6 || October 8 || @ Anaheim Mighty Ducks
|-
| 7 || October 9 || Colorado Avalanche
|-

|-
| 1 || October 13 || @ Colorado Avalanche
|-
| 2 || October 15 || Calgary Flames
|-
| 3 || October 17 || Anaheim Mighty Ducks
|-
| 4 || October 20 || @ Anaheim Mighty Ducks
|-
| 5 || October 23 || Phoenix Coyotes
|-
| 6 || October 26 || @ Toronto Maple Leafs
|-
| 7 || October 28 || @ Ottawa Senators
|-
| 8 || October 30 || @ New York Islanders
|-
| 9 || November 1 || @ New York Rangers
|-
| 10 || November 4 || Atlanta Thrashers
|-
| 11 || November 6 || Pittsburgh Penguins
|-
| 12 || November 9 || @ Detroit Red Wings
|-
| 13 || November 10 || @ Chicago Blackhawks
|-
| 14 || November 12 || @ Columbus Blue Jackets
|-
| 15 || November 14 || @ Florida Panthers
|-
| 16 || November 16 || @ Nashville Predators
|-
| 17 || November 18 || Florida Panthers
|-
| 18 || November 20 || Detroit Red Wings
|-
| 19 || November 26 || @ Phoenix Coyotes
|-
| 20 || November 27 || Chicago Blackhawks
|-
| 21 || November 30 || Dallas Stars
|-
| 22 || December 2 || Washington Capitals
|-
| 23 || December 4 || @ St. Louis Blues
|-
| 24 || December 5 || @ Chicago Blackhawks
|-
| 25 || December 7 || @ Minnesota Wild
|-
| 26 || December 9 || Carolina Hurricanes
|-
| 27 || December 11 || Edmonton Oilers
|-
| 28 || December 14 || Anaheim Mighty Ducks
|-
| 29 || December 16 || Nashville Predators
|-
| 30 || December 18 || Colorado Avalanche
|-
| 31 || December 19 || @ Anaheim Mighty Ducks
|-
| 32 || December 21 || @ Vancouver Canucks
|-
| 33 || December 23 || @ Edmonton Oilers
|-
| 34 || December 26 || @ San Jose Sharks
|-
| 35 || December 27 || San Jose Sharks
|-
| 36 || December 29 || @ Dallas Stars
|-
| 37 || January 1 || @ Nashville Predators
|-
| 38 || January 2 || @ St. Louis Blues
|-
| 39 || January 6 || Tampa Bay Lightning
|-
| 40 || January 8 || Philadelphia Flyers
|-
| 41 || January 9 || @ Anaheim Mighty Ducks
|-
| 42 || January 11 || Anaheim Mighty Ducks
|-
| 43 || January 13 || @ San Jose Sharks
|-
| 44 || January 15 || Vancouver Canucks
|-
| 45 || January 18 || Edmonton Oilers
|-
| 46 || January 20 || @ Phoenix Coyotes
|-
| 47 || January 22 || Columbus Blue Jackets
|-
| 48 || January 27 || San Jose Sharks
|-
| 49 || January 29 || Nashville Predators
|-
| 50 || January 31 || @ Dallas Stars
|-
| 51 || February 2 || @ New Jersey Devils
|-
| 52 || February 3 || @ Boston Bruins
|-
| 53 || February 5 || @ Montreal Canadiens
|-
| 54 || February 8 || @ Philadelphia Flyers
|-
| 55 || February 9 || @ Detroit Red Wings
|-
| 56 || February 16 || Calgary Flames
|-
| 57 || February 18 || Minnesota Wild
|-
| 58 || February 19 || Colorado Avalanche
|-
| 59 || February 21 || Phoenix Coyotes
|-
| 60 || February 23 || Dallas Stars
|-
| 61 || February 25 || @ Phoenix Coyotes
|-
| 62 || February 26 || St. Louis Blues
|-
| 63 || March 1 || Buffalo Sabres
|-
| 64 || March 3 || Minnesota Wild
|-
| 65 || March 5 || Vancouver Canucks
|-
| 66 || March 8 || @ Minnesota Wild
|-
| 67 || March 9 || @ Columbus Blue Jackets
|-
| 68 || March 11 || @ Dallas Stars
|-
| 69 || March 13 || Phoenix Coyotes
|-
| 70 || March 15 || Chicago Blackhawks
|-
| 71 || March 17 || New York Islanders
|-
| 72 || March 19 || St. Louis Blues
|-
| 73 || March 22 || Detroit Red Wings
|-
| 74 || March 24 || @ Calgary Flames
|-
| 75 || March 26 || @ Vancouver Canucks
|-
| 76 || March 28 || Dallas Stars
|-
| 77 || March 30 || San Jose Sharks
|-
| 78 || March 31 || @ San Jose Sharks
|-
| 79 || April 2 || @ Colorado Avalanche
|-
| 80 || April 4 || @ Calgary Flames
|-
| 81 || April 5 || @ Edmonton Oilers
|-
| 82 || April 9 || Columbus Blue Jackets
|-

Transactions
The Kings were involved in the following transactions from June 8, 2004, the day after the deciding game of the 2004 Stanley Cup Finals, through February 16, 2005, the day the  season was officially cancelled.

Trades

Players acquired

Players lost

Signings

Draft picks
Los Angeles' draft picks at the 2004 NHL Entry Draft.

Notes

References

Los
Los
Los Angeles Kings seasons
LA Kings
LA Kings